The 2018–19 Old Dominion Monarchs men’s basketball team represented Old Dominion University during the 2018–19 NCAA Division I men's basketball season. The Monarchs, led by sixth-year head coach Jeff Jones, played their home games at the Ted Constant Convocation Center in Norfolk, Virginia as members of Conference USA. They finished the season 26-9, 13-5 to finish in 1st place. In the C-USA Tournament, they defeated Louisiana Tech, UAB, and Western Kentucky to win the C-USA Tournament. As a result, they received an automatic bid to the NCAA Tournament where they lost in the first round to Purdue.

Previous season
The Monarchs finished the season 25–7, 15–3 in C-USA play to finish in second place. They defeated Louisiana Tech in the quarterfinals of the C-USA tournament before losing to Western Kentucky in the semifinals. Despite winning 25 games on the season, the Monarchs did not participate in a postseason tournament.

Offseason

Departures

Incoming transfers

2018 recruiting class

2019 recruiting class

Honors and awards
Street & Smith's Preseason Awards
 All-Conference - Ahmad Caver
 All-Newcomer - Elbert Robinson
 All-Defense - Ahmad Caver

Roster

Schedule and results

|-
!colspan=12 style=| Exhibition

|-
!colspan=12 style=|Non-conference regular season

|-
!colspan=12 style=| Conference USA regular season

|-
!colspan=12 style=| Conference USA tournament

|-
!colspan=12 style=| NCAA tournament

Source

References

Old Dominion
Old Dominion Monarchs men's basketball seasons
Old Dominion Monarchs basketball
Old Dominion Monarchs basketball
Old Dominion